Alieu "Al" Njie is a retired American soccer forward who played professionally in the North American Soccer League, American Soccer League and Major Indoor Soccer League.

Njie attended Florida International University, playing on the men's soccer team in 1977 and 1978.  In 1979, the Fort Lauderdale Strikers selected Njie in the North American Soccer League college draft. He spent the 1979 NASL outdoor and 1979–1980 NASL indoor seasons with the Strikers.  In 1980, the Strikers released Njie and he signed with the Miami Americans of the American Soccer League.  He returned to the indoor game in the fall of 1980, this time with the Phoenix Inferno of the Major Indoor Soccer League.

References

External links
 MISL/NASL stats

Living people
1955 births
Soccer players from Atlanta
American soccer players
American Soccer League (1933–1983) players
FIU Panthers men's soccer players
Fort Lauderdale Strikers (1977–1983) players
Major Indoor Soccer League (1978–1992) players
Miami Americans players
North American Soccer League (1968–1984) indoor players
North American Soccer League (1968–1984) players
Phoenix Inferno players
Association football forwards